"The Uncle Devil Show" is the second segment of the tenth episode from the first season (1985–86) of the television series The Twilight Zone. It is a single-scene skit in which a young boy performs magic learned from watching a macabre television program.

Plot
A young boy named Joey is given a video called Tim Ferrit and Friends that he has been asking for. Joey's parents both admit they know nothing about the nature of the video, while ironically commenting on how involvement and oversight are the key to good parenting. Joey watches the video, which is a Bozo The Clown/Mister Rogers-like children's show on which the host, Uncle Devil, advises children to eat more sweets and not to brush their teeth, and shows them how to perform black magic. Joey attempts to repeat the tricks Uncle Devil teaches, first trying to make flowers appear out of an urn. Instead, cockroaches emerge from the urn. Every trick Joey attempts makes the world around him stranger and stranger, while his parents remain oblivious. Uncle Devil teaches the "Big Wish." Joey wishes that his toy dinosaur was real, and outside a life-sized dinosaur attempts to enter the house. The TV show ends and the world seemingly returns to normal. Joey is called to dinner, and as he runs to the living room, a new episode of Tim Ferrit and Friends begins on the tape. This time, it is called "Tim Ferrit in Hell". Cockroaches begin to crawl out of the urn.

External links
 

The Twilight Zone (1985 TV series season 1) episodes
1985 American television episodes
Fiction about the Devil
Television episodes about demons
Fictional television shows

fr:Le Petit Magicien